Empire is a 2012 BBC and Open University co-production, written and presented by Jeremy Paxman, charting the rise of the British Empire from the trading companies of India to the rule over a quarter of the world's population and its legacy in the modern world.

Media
A book, Empire: What Ruling the World Did to the British, and a region 2 DVD Empire accompany the series.

Reception
The series was criticised by some for its handling of controversial material while trying to avoid offense to numerous stakeholders and audiences. Associate editor of The Guardian, Michael White, said that "the structure of the programme was ramshackle" and he found the narrative to be "episodic and superficial". He said that Paxman "was diffident charm itself", as opposed to treating "the former subjects of empire with his customary ... abrasiveness". While White also found "the photography pretty as always", he concluded that "the overall effect was curiously patronising, serving to reinforce the impression that the great man was basically on a jolly and going through the motions".

Stuart Jeffries, also for The Guardian, offered similar views, concluding that "Jeremy Paxman fails to argue strongly enough".

References

External links 
 

2010s British documentary television series
2012 British television series debuts
2012 British television series endings
BBC television documentaries about history during the 16th and 17th centuries
Works about the British Empire
BBC television documentaries about history during the 18th and 19th centuries
BBC television documentaries about history during the 20th Century